ČSD Class 477.0 is the last type of steam locomotive made by ČKD for Czechoslovak State Railways. In total 60 tank locomotives with axle arrangement 2′D′ 2′ (4-8-4) were produced in 1951-1952 and 1955. It was a tank locomotive development of the ČSD Class 475.0 locomotive.

Three are preserved, as of 2018 two of them were still operational (013 and 043).

References 

Steam locomotives of Czechoslovakia
ČKD locomotives
4-8-4T locomotives
Railway locomotives introduced in 1951
Standard gauge locomotives of Czechoslovakia